The Banishment of Cicero is a 1761 tragedy play by the British writer Richard Cumberland. It follows the downfall and death of the Roman orator Marcus Tullius Cicero. David Garrick declined to stage the play, so Cumberland instead had it published. After this Cumberland switched to writing generally much lighter works, mostly comedy.

References

Bibliography

Title: THE BANISHMENT OF CICERO. A Tragedy
Publisher: Printed for J. Walter, London
Publication Date: 1761
Binding: Disbound
Edition: First Edition
 Nicoll, Allardyce. A History of English Drama 1660-1900. Volume III: Late Eighteenth Century Drama. Cambridge University Press, 1952.

External links
 THE BANISHMENT OF CICERO. A Tragedy

Plays by Richard Cumberland
1761 plays
Cultural depictions of Cicero